Rokua National Park is a UNESCO Global Geopark in the Northern Ostrobothnia region of Finland.

Location 

The national park is located on the southern side of the Rokuanvaara Hill, where old pine forests grow in their natural state. The park lies within the municipalities of Vaala, Muhos and Utajärvi and in between the cities of Oulu and Kajaani.

Geology 

The bedrock of the Baltic Shield as well as Quaternary landforms are displayed within the park. Amongst the glacial landforms found in the park are:
Drumlins
Eskers
Hummocky moraines
Kettle holes
Terminal moraines
Post-glacial development has left berms, ravines, dunes and peat bogs in the park area.

Syvyydenkaivo 

Syvyydenkaivo, "the Well of the Depths", is the deepest kettle hole in Finland, with a measured depth of more than 164 feet (50 m).

See also 
 List of national parks of Finland
 Protected areas of Finland
 Rokua Geopark
 Rokua

References

External links
 
 Rokua National Park
 Rokua Geopark

National parks of Finland
Protected areas established in 1956
Geography of North Ostrobothnia
Geography of Kainuu
Geoparks in Finland
Global Geoparks Network members
Protected areas established in 2010
Tourist attractions in North Ostrobothnia
Tourist attractions in Kainuu